Soybean sprout is a culinary vegetable grown by sprouting soybeans. It can be grown by placing and watering the sprouted soybeans in the shade until the roots grow long. Soybean sprouts are extensively cultivated and consumed in Asian countries.

History 

It is assumed that soybean sprouts have been eaten since the Three Kingdoms of Korea. Records of kongnamul cultivation are found in an early 13th century medical book, Emergency Folk Medicine Remedies, published in Goryeo. The book states that in 935, during the foundation of Goryeo, a Taebong general, Bae Hyeon-gyeong, offered soybean sprouts to starving soldiers.

Cooking methods of soybean sprout dishes are listed in Farm Management, a Joseon farming and living book. Another Joseon document, Literary Miscellany of Seongho, states that the poor used soybean sprouts to make juk (rice porridge). According to Complete Works of Cheongjanggwan, an essay collection from the Joseon era, soybean sprout was one of the main foods consumed during times of famine.

Culinary use

Korea 
Soybean sprouts are one of the most common and basic ingredients in Korean cuisine. In Korean, the word kongnamul refers to both the soybean sprouts themselves and the namul (seasoned vegetable dish) made from soybean sprouts. The namul dish, made by stir-frying soybean sprouts with sesame oil and simmering it, is a common dish for jesa (ancestral rite). Another common side dish is kongnamul-muchim, made by seasoning boiled soybean sprouts. Soybean sprouts are also used in bibimbap and varieties of jjim dishes, such as agwi-jjim (braised angler). Sometimes, kongnamul-bap (rice cooked with soybean sprouts) eaten with herbed soy sauce constitutes a rustic meal. Clear soup made with soybean sprouts is called kongnamul-guk, which can also be served cold in summer. Kongnamul-gukbap or kongnamul-haejangguk (soybean sprout hangover soup) is usually served in a ttukbaegi (earthenware pot) with the rice in the bottom and the soup poured over the top. In contemporary South Korea, a spicy pork bulgogi dish made with a large number of soybean sprouts, called kongnamul-bulgogi (or kongbul, is popular among young people.

Nepal 
In Nepalese cuisine, kwati, a soup of nine types of sprouted beans, is specially prepared in the festival of Janai Purnima which normally falls in August. Kwati is prepared by frying and mixing onion, garlic, ginger, potatoes, spices and bean sprouts, including soybean sprouts. Much variation exists from house to house. It is considered a nutritious food in Nepal. The kwati is normally eaten with rice. Sometimes meat (especially fried goat meat) is added to spice up the kwati.

See also 
 Bean sprout
 Mung bean sprout

References 

Chinese cuisine
Japanese cuisine
Korean cuisine
Korean vegetables
Namul
Soy-based foods
Sprouting